Salgueiro Atlético Clube is a Brazilian football club, founded in 1972 in Salgueiro, Pernambuco.

History
The club was founded on May 23, 1972.
Salgueiro's greatest achievement so far was being the first club outside Recife, to win the Pernambuco state championship. This fact was accomplished on August 6, 2020.

Achievements
  Pernambuco Championship Second level: 1
2007
  Copa Pernambuco: 1
2005
 Copa Integração: 1
2005
  Pernambuco Championship: 1
2020

Appearances in competitions
  Pernambuco Championship Second level: 2
 2005, 2007
  Campeonato Pernambucano: 5
2006, 2008, 2009, 2010, 2011
  Campeonato Brasileiro Série C: 3
 2008 (14th), 2009 (10th), 2010 (3rd)
  Campeonato Brasileiro Série B: 1
 2011

Rivalry

Salgueiro versus Olympilagos

Current squad

Out on  loan

External links
  Official site

 
Association football clubs established in 1972
Football clubs in Pernambuco
1972 establishments in Brazil